A Very Special Christmas 2 is the second in the A Very Special Christmas series of Christmas-themed compilation albums produced to benefit the Special Olympics. The album was released on October 20, 1992, and production was overseen by Jimmy Iovine, Vicki Iovine and Robert Sargent Shriver for A&M Records. Tupac Shakur was supposed to be featured on the album, but due to legal trouble his song was dropped.

On December 7, 2001, A Very Special Christmas 2 was certified Double Platinum for shipment of two million copies in the United States since its 1992 release. As of November 2014, it is the 21st best-selling Christmas/holiday album in the United States during the SoundScan era of music sales tracking (March 1991 – present), having sold 2,200,000 copies according to SoundScan.

Track listing

References

External links 
A Very Special Christmas 2 at Amazon.com
Special Olympics: A Very Special Christmas

1992 Christmas albums
Albums produced by Jimmy Iovine
1992 compilation albums
A&M Records compilation albums
A Very Special Christmas